Budanov is a Russian masculine surname, its feminine counterpart is Budanova. It may refer to
Abram Budanov (1886–1929), Ukrainian anarchist military commander
Aleksandr Budanov (born 1991), Russian football player
Kyrylo Budanov (born 1986), Ukrainian army major general and chief of the Main Intelligence Directorate
Yekaterina Budanova (1916–1943), Soviet fighter pilot
 Yuri Budanov (1963–2011), Russian military officer, convicted of crimes in Chechnya

See also 
Budaniv

Russian-language surnames